Rivière-aux-Outardes is an unorganized territory in the Côte-Nord region of Quebec, Canada. It makes up almost 95% of the Manicouagan Regional County Municipality.

The other major river in the territory is the Manicouagan River that flows parallel and east of the Outardes River. Both these rivers are developed with large-scale hydroelectric installations, part of the Manic-Outardes Project.

The Manicouagan Reservoir, a circular lake that covers the Manicouagan impact structure, is almost entirely located within the territory.

Quebec Route 389, running for a large part between the Outardes and Manicouagan Rivers, provides access to the territory and the hydroelectric installations along these rivers. It is an isolated highway with few roadside services that are great distances apart.

Demographics
Population trend:
 Population in 2021: 92 (2016 to 2021 population change: -2.1%)
 Population in 2016: 94
 Population in 2011: 86
 Population in 2006: 134
 Population in 2001: 48
 Population in 1996: 59
 Population in 1991: 32

Private dwellings occupied by usual residents: 56 (total dwellings: 166)

See also 
Franquelin River
Rivière Franquelin Branche Ouest
Lessard River (rivière Franquelin Branche Ouest)

References

External links

Unorganized territories in Côte-Nord